United Nations Security Council Resolution 176, adopted on October 4, 1962, after examining the application of the Democratic and Popular Republic of Algeria for membership in the United Nations the Council recommended to the General Assembly that the Democratic and Popular Republic of Algeria be admitted.

The resolution passed with ten votes to none, while the Republic of China abstained.

See also
List of United Nations Security Council Resolutions 101 to 200 (1953–1965)

References
Text of the Resolution at undocs.org

External links
 

 0176
 0176
 0176
1962 in Algeria
October 1962 events